Emilinha Borba (August 31, 1923 in Rio de Janeiro – October 3, 2005) was a Brazilian singer and actress. She was named "Rainha do Rádio", "Queen of the Radio" in 1953. Borba endured for 30 years as a popular Brazilian radio singer and was noted for rumbas and sambas.

She visited London, UK in 1988 and was appointed the Madrinha (Godmother) of the London School of Samba. She also appeared with the LSS on its parade at the 1988 Notting Hill Carnival.

Selected filmography
Poeira de Estrelas (1948)

Web source

External links 

1923 births
2005 deaths
20th-century Brazilian women singers
20th-century Brazilian singers